Thomas Pritchard may refer to:
 Thomas Farnolls Pritchard, English architect and interior decorator, known for the design of the first cast-iron bridge in the world
 Thomas Pritchard (priest), Welsh Anglican priest

See also
 Thomas Prichard (disambiguation)